Patricia Meunier-Lebouc (born 16 November 1972) is a French former professional golfer who played on the Ladies European Tour and the LPGA Tour. Her birth name was Meunier and she is married to Antoine Lebouc, a French professional golfer who played on the European Tour in the 1990s.

Amateur career
Meunier was born in Dijon, France. She won the French Cup and the Greece International in 1993. In 1992, she won the French Ladies Championship, placed fifth in the World Team Championship and finished third at the European Team Junior Championship.

Professional career
Meunier-Lebouc turned professional in 1994 and initially played on the Ladies European Tour, gaining her maiden victory in her rookie season at the Waterford English Open. She has won 5 more times on the LET and finished in the top 10 in the Order of Merit in 1997 and 2000. She qualified for the LPGA Tour by tying for 27th at the LPGA Final Qualifying Tournament to earn non-exempt status for the 2001 season.

In her rookie year in 2001, Meunier-Lebouc recorded two top-ten finishes, then won the State Farm Classic in 2002, and the Kraft Nabisco Championship in 2003, a major title. She was the 54-hole leader at the 2003 Women's British Open, but finished in solo fifth place. In February 2004, she gave birth to her first child, daughter Phildine Pearl, and opted not to defend her title at the 2004 Kraft Nabisco Championship in late March.

In 2000, Meunier-Lebouc became the first French player to compete in the Solheim Cup, and returned in 2003.

Meunier-Lebouc retired from playing professional golf in 2009, and became a golf instructor at the Ibis Golf & Country Club in 2010.

Professional wins (8)

LPGA Tour (2)

Ladies European Tour (5)
1994 (1) Waterford Dairies Ladies' English Open
1997 (1) Guardian Irish Open
1998 (1) Air France Madame Open
2000 (2) Open de France Dames, Ladies Austrian Open

Other wins (1)
1997 (1) Praia D'el Rey European Cup (team competition)

Major championships

Wins (1)

Results timeline

CUT = missed the half-way cut
WD = withdrew
"T" = tied

Summary

Most consecutive cuts made – 11 (2001 British – 2004 British)
Longest streak of top-10s – 1 (three times)

LPGA Tour career summary

Team appearances
Amateur
Espirito Santo Trophy (representing France): 1992
European Ladies' Team Championship (representing France): 1993

Professional
Solheim Cup (representing Europe): 2000 (winners), 2003 (winners)
World Cup (representing France): 2005

Solheim Cup record

References

External links

French female golfers
Ladies European Tour golfers
LPGA Tour golfers
Winners of LPGA major golf championships
Solheim Cup competitors for Europe
Mediterranean Games medalists in golf
Mediterranean Games silver medalists for France
Competitors at the 1993 Mediterranean Games
Sportspeople from Dijon
People from Jupiter, Florida
1972 births
Living people
20th-century French women
21st-century French women